

Highest-grossing films

List of films
A list of films released in Japan in 1999 (see 1999 in film).

See also
1999 in Japan
1999 in Japanese television

Notes

References

External links
 Japanese films of 1999 at the Internet Movie Database

1999
Japanese
Films